Mikkola is a Finnish language name that can occur both as a surname and as a toponym. It may refer to:

Surname
 Mikkola (surname)

Places
 Mikkola, Ontario, Canada
 Mikkola, Vantaa, Finland
 Mikkola, Pori, Finland

See also

 Luolajan-Mikkola